Western Mere Secondary School was a school in Breaston, Derbyshire. Established in 1957, the school was located on Gregory Avenue until it was closed in 1990 and demolished in 1992.  The area is now used a grazing area for horses, though the old school is still visible on the ground with the floors still visible.

References

Educational institutions disestablished in 1990
Educational institutions established in 1957
Defunct schools in Derbyshire
1957 establishments in England
1990 disestablishments in England
Demolished buildings and structures in England
Buildings and structures demolished in 1992